Records of the Three Kingdoms may refer to:

Records of the Three Kingdoms (三國志), Chinese historical text by Chen Shou
Samguk sagi (三國史記), Korean historical text by Kim Busik (written in Chinese)
Romance of the Three Kingdoms (三國演義), novel based on Chen Shou's work
Romance of the Three Kingdoms (video game series)
Sangokushi (manga)
Three Kingdoms (manhua)

See also
Romance of the Three Kingdoms (disambiguation)
Three Kingdoms (disambiguation)